WHTH (790 AM, "107.7 Buckeye Country") is a radio station  broadcasting a country music format. Licensed to Heath, Ohio, United States.  The station is locally owned and operated by the Runnymede Corporation.

References

External links

HTH